Bomfim is a surname. Notable people with the surname include:

Sâmia Bomfim (born 1989), Brazilian politician
Thiago Bomfim (born 1990), Brazilian field hockey player
Uilliams Bomfim Souza (born 1989), Brazilian footballer